Nuziveedu Seeds Ltd is an Indian agribusiness company which markets seeds.
Nuziveedu Seeds Ltd, acknowledged as India’s largest hybrid seed company, believes that it has played an important role in Indian agriculture by developing and supplying quality hybrids and varietal seeds to millions of farmers. Nuziveedu Seeds Ltd, which was originally established as a part of NSL Group, has served Indian farmers for more than four decades. The company has a presence in 17 states and markets approximately 350 varieties of seed products to more than 5.5 million farmers across India.

The genesis of the NSL Group was laid by Sri Mandava Venkatramaiah, who in 1971 foresaw the opportunity of the agriculture sector and the value of hybrid cotton seeds in the Indian cotton produce market. Being inspired by his deep conviction in the cotton seed technology and his vision to make the hybrid cotton seed available to cotton cultivators the postgraduate in agricultural sciences and the enterprising farmer of the Nuziveedu town of Andhra Pradesh, Sri Venkataramaiah founded the seeds business of the NSL Group in 1973.

The seeds business of the NSL Group was created out of a hobby and was later transformed by Sri Venkataramaiah's son, Mr M Prabhakar Rao, who took over the reins of the seeds business of the NSL Group in 1982. Under his leadership, Nuziveedu Seeds has become the largest hybrid seed company in India (in terms of volumes of Bt cotton seed packets sold in 2009-10).
 At present, M Prabhakar Rao is also President of the National Seed Association of India (NSAI) 
Nuziveedu Seeds is also a market leader in hybrid cotton seed and paddy seed.

Awards
Department of Scientific and Industrial Research Award

See also
Genome Valley
Pharmaceutical industry in India

References

Agriculture companies of India
Intensive farming
Indian companies established in 1973
Companies based in Hyderabad, India
Seed companies
Indian brands
Agriculture companies established in 1973
1973 establishments in Andhra Pradesh